The Road West is an American television Western series that aired on NBC from September 12, 1966, to May 1, 1967.

Overview
Ben Pride moves with his children Timothy, Midge, and Kip, his new wife Elizabeth, his father Tom, and his brother-in-law Chance from Ohio to Kansas during the 1860s.  The show centers around the difficulties the family faces taming the land and homesteading.

Cast

Episodes

Production
Executive producer Macdonnell regarded the show's storyline as being identifiable to the viewing audience, with an essential family unit comprising family members "bound to the other by either a true familiar relationship or by an intangible camaraderie". A core idea of the show was to present a realistic portrayal of the real struggles faced by settlers who traveled 'The Road West', with extreme temperatures in each of the summer and winter seasons.

The show's lead actor, Barry Sullivan, was marking his fourth series and described the show as being "a piece of pioneer literature". He had previously expressed that he would never star in a weekly television series again, although he warmed to the show when he began working closely with the cast and crew. Having spent long periods of time driving an old wagon for the show, Sullivan decided to take lessons and spent seven consecutive Saturdays in Antelope Valley, California perfecting the driving technique.

Production moved away from Kansas in 1967, with it reported that the shift in location was always the plan, although happened sooner than anticipated due to the show's future being at risk. Ratings struggled against other shows including Family Affair and The Felony Squad, while Seel's character Tom Pride was killed off to reduce costs.

Filming
Sullivan said in an interview that scripts for the show would be provided several weeks in advance, which allowed time to absorb the scripts in order to perfect their lines and character portrayals.

Reception
The show was highly anticipated by The Atlanta Constitution writer Paul Jones, who predicted that the show would "be the most successful new show of the television season", based on his opinion that there had not been a western show flop for considerable time and of his high rating for producer Norman Macdonnell.

References

Further reading
 Barry's Approach: Soft and Simple, The Akron Beacon Journal, September 4, 1966, page 66
 A New Program in Gunsmoke's Mould, The Buffalo News, July 30, 1966, page 51
 Traffic jam on the road west, Detroit Free Press, August 28, 1966, page 62

1966 American television series debuts
1967 American television series endings
NBC original programming
1960s Western (genre) television series